Players and pairs who neither have high enough rankings nor receive wild cards may participate in a qualifying tournament held one week before the annual Wimbledon Tennis Championships.

The qualifying rounds for the 1998 Wimbledon Championships were played from 15 to 21 May 1998 at the Civil Service Sports Ground in Chiswick, London, Great Britain.

Seeds

  Cara Black (qualified)
  Haruka Inoue (qualified)
  Karin Miller (qualifying competition, lucky loser)
  Jolene Watanabe (second round)
  Sandra Klösel (first round)
  Émilie Loit (first round)
  Els Callens (qualified)
  Conchita Martínez Granados (first round)
  Radka Bobková (qualified)
  Lilia Osterloh (qualifying competition, lucky loser)
  Meghann Shaughnessy (first round)
  Annabel Ellwood (qualifying competition)
  Shinobu Asagoe (first round)
  Anne Kremer (qualifying competition)
  Laurence Courtois (second round)
  Raluca Sandu (first round)

Qualifiers

  Cara Black
  Silvija Talaja
  Radka Bobková
  Surina de Beer
  Els Callens
  Miriam Schnitzer
  Rennae Stubbs
  Haruka Inoue

Lucky losers

  Karin Miller
  Lilia Osterloh

Qualifying draw

First qualifier

Second qualifier

Third qualifier

Fourth qualifier

Fifth qualifier

Sixth qualifier

Seventh qualifier

Eighth qualifier

External links

1998 Wimbledon Championships on WTAtennis.com
1998 Wimbledon Championships – Women's draws and results at the International Tennis Federation

Women's Singles Qualifying
Wimbledon Championship by year – Women's singles qualifying
Wimbledon Championships